Joseph Sherrard Kearns (February 12, 1907 – February 17, 1962) was an American actor, who is best remembered for his role as George Wilson ("Mr. Wilson") on the CBS television series Dennis the Menace from 1959 until his death in 1962. He was also a prolific radio actor, and provided the voice of the Doorknob in the 1951 animated Disney film, Alice in Wonderland.

Early life
Joseph Sherrard Kearns was born in Salt Lake City, Utah, the only child of Joseph Albert Kearns, a wool buyer, and Cordelia Marie Peterson, a concert pianist, from whom he derived his love of music. Kearns was 29 years old when his father died, at which time he and his mother moved to California. He and his family were devout Mormons, whose ancestors were Mormon pioneers. 

His first acting experience was in 1916 when he joined "The Rising Generation", a vaudeville troupe of eleven children that toured for 14 months. He studied at the University of Utah, teaching a course in theatrical make-up to fund his tuition. After graduating from college, he briefly tried his hand at wool buying and worked for his father for a year.  Kearns traveled the West as a representative of Howell, Jones and Donnell of Boston. His wool-buying career came to an abrupt end when Kearns purchased five boxcars full of black wool from a breed called Karakul for $8,000. The problem was that black wool could not be dyed and no one knew how to use it in those days. After this fiasco, Kearns gladly gave up the wool business and pursued a show business career.

Career

Radio
Kearns joined the staff of radio station KSL in Salt Lake City in 1930 remaining there until 1936 when he moved to Los Angeles. He began his acting career in radio in the 1930s (playing the Crazyquilt Dragon in the serial The Cinnamon Bear), becoming active during the 1940s, with appearances on the shows The Adventures of Sam Spade, Burns and Allen, The Whistler, and dozens of other shows. On Suspense, he was almost a mainstay, heard regularly as the host "The Man in Black" in the early years, announcing many episodes in the later run, and playing supporting and occasional lead roles in hundreds of shows throughout the series' tenure in Hollywood, from judges to kindly old-timers to cowards. He also appeared on The New Adventures of Sherlock Holmes, playing various different characters including Professor Moriarty and even Dr. Watson.

Film career
Kearns made his film debut in Hard, Fast and Beautiful (1951). He was the voice of the Doorknob in Disney's animated film, Alice in Wonderland (1951). Kearns appeared in other movies, making his final film appearance as the crime photographer in Anatomy of a Murder (1959).

Television
On television, Kearns reprised his radio roles on The Jack Benny Program and also appeared with Eve Arden and Richard Crenna in Our Miss Brooks (1953–55), first as Assistant Superintendent Michaels and later (in eight episodes) as Superintendent Stone, a role that he had played on radio. He appeared on The George Burns and Gracie Allen Show a total of 11 times, The Adventures of Ozzie and Harriet a total of 16 times, I Love Lucy, My Little Margie, Perry Mason, I Married Joan, Willy, December Bride, It's a Great Life, Angel, Gunsmoke, and General Electric Theater.

In 1959, he appeared as criminologist Edward Langley in the Perry Mason episode, "The Case of the Perjured Parrot".

Dennis the Menace
Kearns' final role was as George Wilson, the grouchy, cantankerous neighbor on CBS's Dennis the Menace based on the comic strip by Hank Ketcham.  After his death, Kearns was replaced in the cast by Gale Gordon, who played George Wilson's brother John. Kearns and Gordon had worked together prior to Dennis the Menace, on the old radio show The Cinnamon Bear and in the 1956 film Our Miss Brooks. In the last episode that aired before Kearns' death, episode 89 entitled "Where There's a Will", the story dealt with Mr. Wilson making out a will and explaining that Dennis would inherit his gold watch when he dies. The last episode Kearns filmed was titled "The Man Next Door", episode 100, and shown on May 6, 1962, three months after his death. There were references to George being 'back east' in subsequent shows.

Personal life
Kearns, who was musically trained by his mother, had played the pipe organ for a Los Angeles theatre in the 1930s.  He purchased a Hammond organ and installed it in a studio apartment that he designed and built in the 1940s.  He later purchased a larger 18-rank Wurlitzer organ that had been designed for Warner Brothers in 1929.  He then designed and built a soundproof -story home around the organ. Kearns delighted in playing the organ for his guests. 

A Republican, he supported Dwight Eisenhower during the 1952 presidential election.

Death
Kearns suffered a cerebral hemorrhage on February 11, 1962, during the third season of Dennis the Menace and was hospitalized in a coma, but never regained consciousness and died on February 17, 1962, five days after his 55th birthday. His death may have been attributed to the Metrecal diet he was on, as he had reportedly lost 40 pounds in six weeks. He was buried at the Forest Lawn, Hollywood Hills Cemetery in Los Angeles.

Selected filmography
The Hucksters (1947) – Radio Voice (uncredited)
Hard, Fast and Beautiful (1951) – J.R. Carpenter
Alice in Wonderland (1951) – Doorknob (voice)
Daddy Long Legs (1955) – Guide (uncredited)
Our Miss Brooks (1956) – Mr. Stone
Storm Center (1956) – Mr. Morrisey
The Girl Most Likely (1958) – Mr. Schlom, Bank Manager (uncredited)
The Gift of Love (1958) – Mr. Rynicker
Anatomy of a Murder (1959) – Lloyd Burke
How to Marry a Millionaire (1957–1959, TV series) –  Mr. Augustus P. Tobey

References

External links
 
 

1907 births
1962 deaths
Male actors from California
American male film actors
American male radio actors
American male voice actors
Male actors from Salt Lake City
University of Utah alumni
20th-century American male actors
Burials at Forest Lawn Memorial Park (Hollywood Hills)
Latter Day Saints from Utah
Latter Day Saints from California
California Republicans
Utah Republicans